Youmans is a surname of English origin, a variant of "yeoman".  Notable persons with this last name include:

Ashley Youmans, birth-name of Ashley Alexandra Dupré, call girl connected to the Eliot Spitzer prostitution scandal
Charlotte Youmans, New Zealand painter
Clarion A. Youmans, American politician
Edward L. Youmans, American science writer, advocate of Darwinism, and founder of Popular Science magazine; brother of Eliza Ann Youmans
Eliza Ann Youmans, American science writer (sister of Edward L. Youmans)
Floyd Youmans, American baseball player
Frank A. Youmans, American judge
Heather Youmans, American singer-songwriter, voice actor, and journalist
Henry M. Youmans, American politician
Laurel E. Youmans, American politician and physician
LeRoy Franklin Youmans, American politician
Letitia Youmans, Canadian Temperance advocate and WCTU organizer
Marly Youmans, American author and poet
Maury Youmans, American professional football player
Theodora W. Youmans, American journalist and women's suffrage activist
Vincent Youmans, American Broadway composer
Will Youmans, Palestinian-American human rights activist and rapper
William Youmans, Broadway actor (grand-nephew of Vincent Youmans)